The Critics' Choice Movie Award for Best Visual Effects is one of the awards given to people working in the motion picture industry by the Broadcast Film Critics Association. It was first presented in 2009.

List of winners and nominees

2000s
2009: Avatar  
 2012
 District 9 
 The Lovely Bones
 Star Trek

2010s
2010: Inception 
 Alice in Wonderland 
 Harry Potter and the Deathly Hallows – Part 1 
 Tron: Legacy

2011: Rise of the Planet of the Apes 
 Harry Potter and the Deathly Hallows – Part 2 
 Hugo 
 Super 8
 The Tree of Life

2012: Life of Pi 
 The Avengers 
 Cloud Atlas
 The Dark Knight Rises
 The Hobbit: An Unexpected Journey

2013: Gravity 
 The Hobbit: The Desolation of Smaug 
 Iron Man 3 
 Pacific Rim
 Star Trek Into Darkness

2014: Dawn of the Planet of the Apes 
 Edge of Tomorrow
 Guardians of the Galaxy 
 The Hobbit: The Battle of the Five Armies
 Interstellar 

2015: Mad Max: Fury Road 
 Ex Machina 
 Jurassic World
 The Martian 
 The Revenant 
 The Walk

2016: The Jungle Book 
 Arrival
 Doctor Strange 
 Fantastic Beasts and Where to Find Them
 A Monster Calls

2017: War for the Planet of the Apes 
 Blade Runner 2049 
 Dunkirk
 The Shape of Water
 Thor: Ragnarok
 Wonder Woman

2018: Black Panther
 Avengers: Infinity War
 First Man
 Mary Poppins Returns
 Mission: Impossible – Fallout
 Ready Player One

2019: Avengers: Endgame
 1917
 Ad Astra
 The Aeronauts
 Ford v Ferrari
 The Irishman
 The Lion King

2020s
2020: Tenet
 Greyhound 
 The Invisible Man 
 Mank
 The Midnight Sky
 Mulan
 Wonder Woman 1984

2021: Dune
 The Matrix Resurrections
 Nightmare Alley
 No Time to Die
 Shang-Chi and the Legend of the Ten Rings

2022: Avatar: The Way of Water
 The Batman
 Black Panther: Wakanda Forever
 Everything Everywhere All at Once
 RRR
 Top Gun: Maverick

See also
Academy Award for Best Visual Effects

Notes

References

V
Lists of films by award
Awards established in 2009

fr:Critics Choice Award du meilleur film d'animation
vi:Giải BFCA cho phim hoạt hình hay nhất